This was the first edition of the tournament.

Austin Krajicek and Nicholas Monroe won the title after defeating Marcelo Arévalo and James Cerretani 4–6, 7–6(7–3), [10–5] in the final.

Seeds

Draw

References
 Main Draw

Oracle Challenger Series - Houston - Men's Doubles
2018 Men's Doubles